

Births and deaths

Deaths
 Seamus Ennis (1912–1982)
 Joe Heaney (1919–1984)
 Luke Kelly (1940–1984)
 Hugh Gillespie (1906–1986)
 Ewan MacColl (1915–1989)
 Margaret Barry (1917–c. 1989 or 1990)
 Ciarán Bourke

Recordings
 1980 "Mist Covered Mountain" (De Dannan)
 1981 "Star Spangled Molly" (De Dannan)
 1981 "Plays with Himself" (Derek Bell)
 1982 "Musical Ireland" (Derek Bell)
 1984 "Red Roses for Me" (The Pogues)
 1985 "Rum, Sodomy and The Lash" (The Pogues)
 1985 "To Welcome Paddy Home" (The Boys of the Lough)
 1986 "The Celts" (Enya)
 1987 "Altan" (Altan)
 1988 "If I Should Fall From Grace With God" (The Pogues)

1980